Coelioxys banksi is a species of leafcutter, mason, and resin bees in the family Megachilidae.

References

Further reading

 
 
 

banksi
Insects described in 1914